Inside is a 2012 Turkish drama film directed by Zeki Demirkubuz. It is inspired by Fyodor Dostoevsky's 1864 novella Notes from Underground.

Cast 
 Engin Günaydın as Muharrem
 Serhat Tutumluer as Cevat
 Nihal Yalçın as Türkan
 Sarp Apak as Barmen
 Murat Cemcir as Sinan
 Serkan Keskin as Tarik
Feridun Koç - Ferdiun

References

External links 

Turkish drama films
2012 drama films
2012 films
2010s Turkish-language films